Marouen Lahmar (born 7 February 1982) is a Tunisian basketball player currently playing for Club Africain in the Tunisian Basketball League.  

Lahmar is a member of the Tunisia national basketball team that finished third at the 2009 FIBA Africa Championship to qualify for the country's first FIBA World Championship.  Lahmar averaged 2.7 points per game and 1.4 assists per game off the bench for the Tunisians during the tournament.  He also played for the eighth place Tunisians at the FIBA Africa Championship 2005.

References

Tunisian men's basketball players
1982 births
Living people
Club Africain basketball players
Point guards
21st-century Tunisian people